Paul Chaim Schenck (born 1958) is an ordained clergyman, author, and lecturer.

Early life and work
Schenck was born in Glen Ridge, New Jersey, to Henry P. Schenck and Marjorie M. Apgar. He has two sisters and an identical twin brother with whom he was raised in Grand Island, New York. His father was born Jewish and his mother converted to Judaism from the Catholic and Anglican (Episcopal) churches. He and his brother attended Hebrew School in nearby Niagara Falls until the sixth grade. As a teenager, Schenck turned away from Judaism, and after a period of atheism and agnosticism, he became a born-again Christian. He was married in 1977 in an interfaith ceremony in Niagara Falls, New York, presided by Paul Fodor, the Hungarian Holocaust survivor and author. At the time, Schenck was a student in the Institute of Jewish Studies at the State University of New York at Buffalo. Schenck became director of the Empire State Teen Challenge center, a faith-based residential treatment program for persons with "life-controlling problems" such as substance use and abuse, antisocial behaviors, criminal conduct, and relational conflicts.  He has been active as a religious professional for more than 40 years as a religious educator, counselor, and executive.

Education and experience

Schenck graduated from the Luther Rice University  in 1984 with a B.A. in biblical studies with a focus on the Hebrew Old Testament. He stood his canonical examinations at the Philadelphia Theological Seminary in 1995. In 2005, he received a Master Certificate in executive leadership from the Mendoza College of Business at the University of Notre Dame. He received a master's degree in health care ethics from the Bioethics Institute at Holy Apostles College and Seminary in Cromwell, Connecticut, and received certification in health care ethics. He completed coursework with the Institute for the Psychological Sciences in Arlington, Virginia, where he received a Master of Science degree in psychology, and holds doctorates in educational leadership and pastoral practice from the School of Arts and Education of St. Thomas University and the Graduate Theological Foundation. His post-doctoral degree in Jewish studies was awarded in Interfaith Leadership by the faculty of historic Gratz College in Philadelphia. He completed the seminar in Jewish philosophy at the yeshiva Ohr Somayach, Jerusalem, and studied Hebrew at Baltimore Hebrew University. He completed the Master Course in bioethics at the Kennedy Institute at Georgetown University. Schenck is a registered practitioner with the Association for Clinical Pastoral Education (ACPE), is board certified in pastoral counseling. 

Between 1988 and 1992, Schenck became known as an anti-abortion activist, author, media commentator, and a leader of large public demonstrations. He challenged a federal injunction prohibiting certain demonstration activities. The case, Schenck v. Pro-Choice Network of Western New York, 519 U.S. 357 (1997) was decided by the U.S. Supreme Court, which found 8–1 that certain restrictions against Schenck violated the First Amendment, and 6–3, that others were permissible in the interest of public safety. The remaining restrictions were subsequently struck down in McCullen v. Coakley, 573 U.S. 464 (2014). Between 1994 and 1997, Schenck was executive vice president of the American Center for Law & Justice, a public interest law firm then headed by attorney Jay Alan Sekulow. Sekulow argued Schenck's Supreme Court case. After 2016, Paul Schenck and his twin brother, Robert, "Rev. Rob Schenck", publicly distanced themselves from the anti-abortion movement. Rob Schenck published a memoir entitled, Costly Grace, that criticized the movement for making moral compromises in exchange for political legitimacy. The Schenck brothers no longer consider themselves anti-abortion leaders.

Professional life

Since 2020, Schenck has been a spiritual integration counselor in private practice with clients in telehealth, clinical, and office practice. He is a member of the Association for Clinical Pastoral Education, in which he is a registered practitioner (#16634), and a Certified Clinical Chaplain (NAVAC).    

In his pastoral counseling practice, he uses an eclectic approach, with the main focus on spiritually interpreted logotherapy developed by the neuro-psychiatrist, Viktor Frankl. Logotherapy aims to discover and apply a sense of meaning and purpose in overcoming problems in life such as substance use and abuse, relational conflicts, self-esteem, and self-care, anxiety and depression, and spiritual needs such as love, companionship, enjoyment, optimism, and religious fulfillment.      

Schenck has taught at the Elim Bible College, Lima, New York; the Reformed Episcopal Seminary, Philadelphia; and Thomas More College in Manchester, New Hampshire, and was a guest lecturer at Messiah University, Grantham, Pennsylvania, the State University of New York, Georgetown University, and American University. He is a frequent lecturer on religious, moral, and ethical topics, as well as the bible, Jewish-Christian, and interfaith studies. In 2019 ProQuest published his research in the experience and operation of sensual and emotional empathy using the seminal theoretical work of the phenomenologist, Edith Stein. 

Since December, 2021, Schenck has been a clinical chaplain in the U.S. Department of Veterans Affairs  medical center in Lebanon, Pennsylvania.

Works
 Ten Words That Will Save A Nation, with Rob Schenck
 Constitutions of American Denominations, with Rob Schenck (3 volumes, Hein Law Publishing, 1983)
 Annotated Letter from the Birmingham Jail and Bonhoeffer on Nascent Human Life (National Clergy Council, 1989; 1990)
 A Tyranny of Consensus (Vital Issues Press, 1993)
 The Blackstone Commentaries on the Common Law (4 volumes, Hein Law Publishing, 1994)
 Empathy Towards Persons (ProQuest, 2019)
 Divorce After Conversion (Gratz College/Researchgate, 2020)
 Jeremiah: A Psycho-social Profile (Gratz College/Researchgate, 2020)
 Early American Jewish Personalities (Gratz College/Researchgate, 2021)
 Eastern European Jewish Culture (Gratz College/Researchgate, 2021)
 Who Converted the Great Synagogue into a Movie Theater? (2021, Gratz College/Researchgate)

References

External links
aclj.org
nationalprolifecenter.org
paulschenck.com

1958 births
Activists from New York (state)
American anti-abortion activists
American Christian clergy
American Episcopal priests
Anglican priest converts to Roman Catholicism
Catholic University of America alumni
Converts to Roman Catholicism
Graduate Theological Foundation alumni
Living people
Luther Rice University alumni
People from Catonsville, Maryland
People from Glen Ridge, New Jersey
People from Grand Island, New York
Religious leaders from Buffalo, New York